The University of Gadarif (also called Gedaref, Gedarif or El Gadarif) is a public university in the town of Al Qadarif, capital of the state of Al Qadarif in Sudan.
The university was founded in 1990.
Faculties include Medicine and Health Sciences, Computer Science and Information Technology, Economics and Administrative Sciences,  Agricultural and Environmental, Education and Sharia and Islamic Studies.
The university is a member of the Federation of the Universities of the Islamic World
and the Foundation for Advancement of international Medical Education and Research (FAIMER).

History

Schools and Colleges

_ Faculty of medicine
_ Faculty of pharmacy
_ Faculty of nursing
_ Faculty of engineering and architecture
_ Faculty of Agriculture
_ Faculty of Computer Science
_ Faculty of Medical Laboratory Sciences.

Libraries

Campuses

Accreditation

References

Universities and colleges in Sudan
Al Qadarif (state)
Educational institutions established in 1990
1990 establishments in Sudan